The Vault is a British game show based on the original Israeli version called HaKassefet ) that aired on ITV from 11 May 2002 to 24 August 2004. It was first hosted by Davina McCall in 2002, then hosted by Melanie Sykes from 2003 to 2004 and finally hosted by Gabby Logan who stepped in for Sykes for the latter half of 2004 when Sykes went on maternity leave due to her pregnancy.

Format
Seven contestants competed per episode in the first series, eight in the second, and nine in the third. Each contestant guessed a four-digit combination for the Vault, which held a cash jackpot that began at £100,000 after being won and increased by that amount for every game it went unclaimed. The four whose guesses were farthest away became "brokers," who could offer to sell correct answers, while all others played for a chance at the jackpot.

Brokers were referred to only by their occupation. Starting with the second series, eight home viewers who had called in to the studio were chosen at random to play as brokers in addition to the four in the studio. A new set of call-in brokers was chosen for each round, referred to only by their telephone line numbers (1 through 8).

Round 1
Each player individually had three minutes to answer up to 10 questions, with all other players sequestered in soundproof booths backstage. Players were spotted £1,000 to start the round, could offer multiple guesses without penalty, and could pass as often as desired.

Once a player had answered or passed on all 10 questions, they could negotiate with one broker at a time to get answers to any questions that had stumped them. Each studio broker could press a button to illuminate a light on their podium and signal their readiness to make an offer. However, the player would not know if a particular call-in broker might know an answer until/unless they called on that person. If the player and a broker agreed on a price, the broker then stated their answer; if it was correct, the price was paid to them out of the player's winnings for the round.

Each correct answer awarded £100 to the player, regardless of whether they or a broker had given it. Answering all 10 questions correctly awarded a £5,000 bonus. After all players had taken a turn, the two high scorers kept whatever money they had accumulated and advanced to Round 2. All others were eliminated from the game with no winnings.

Round 2
The two remaining players were each spotted £1,000 to start this round. The host asked alternating questions for four minutes, starting with the high scorer from Round 1. After the host finished a question, the player in control had 15 seconds to respond, and could immediately turn to the brokers for help. If time ran out, the opponent had a further 15 seconds to answer. If both players missed the same question, the host gave the correct answer and moved on to the next one. Players could only use their spotted/accumulated money from this round to buy answers.

Questions were now worth £200 each, and the player who gave more correct answers won a £5,000 bonus. The player with the higher combined total from Rounds 1 and 2 advanced to Round 3, while the other player was eliminated with only their Round 1 winnings.

Round 3
In the final round, which was broadcast live, the player had two minutes to answer 10 questions, each of which added to their total winnings. They could turn to the brokers immediately, and could use any or all of their accumulated money over the course of the entire game (including this round) to purchase answers. Each question had to be answered correctly before the player could move on to the next one.

Question values were as follows:

If the player answered the first nine questions correctly, the clock was stopped and they chose one of three categories. After the host read a question in the chosen category, the clock began to run again and the player had to answer with no help from the brokers.

If the player answered all 10 questions correctly before time ran out, the Vault opened and they won the entire jackpot in addition to their accumulated winnings from the first two rounds. If not, they kept only their accumulated money from all three rounds and a call-in player was chosen at random. This player could win the jackpot by answering six questions in 60 seconds, including two that had been correctly answered during the game.

If both the studio and call-in players failed to win the jackpot, it was increased by £100,000 as a rollover for the next show.

International versions
 Original version   Non-broadcast pilot

External links

2000s British game shows
2002 British television series debuts
2004 British television series endings
English-language television shows
Carlton Television
ITV game shows
Television series by ITV Studios
Television series by King World Productions